Avelino Lopes (born March 4, 1974) is an Angolan football player. He has played for Angola national team.

National team statistics

References

1974 births
Living people
Angolan footballers
Association football forwards
Angola international footballers